Knightley may refer to:

People
Sir Charles Knightley, 2nd Baronet (1781–1864), English politician, father of Rainald
Charles Knightley (born 1972), English cricketer
John Knightley (disambiguation), multiple people
John Knightley (MP), English politician
Louisa Knightley (1842–1913), British Anglican and women's rights activist, wife of Rainald
Lucy Knightley (1742–1791), English politician
Keira Knightley (born 1985), English actress
Philip Knightley, English politician
Phillip Knightley (1929–2016), Australian journalist
Rainald Knightley, 1st Baron Knightley (1819–1895), English politician
Richard Knightley (1533–1615), English politician
Steve Knightley (born 1954), English singer-songwriter and musician
Thomas Knightley (1824–1905), English architect
Valentine Knightley (disambiguation), multiple people
Valentine Knightley (died 1618), English politician and landowner
Will Knightley (born 1946), English actor, father of Keira
William Knightley-Smith (1932–1962), English cricketer

Fictional characters
George Knightley, the hero of Jane Austen's novel Emma

Places
Knightley, Staffordshire, a hamlet in England.

Surnames of English origin